Donald D. "Buddy" Ackerman (September 4, 1930 – July 9, 2011) was an American basketball player.

Ackerman played college basketball for the LIU Brooklyn Blackbirds during the 1950–51 season.  He was selected by the New York Knicks in the second round of the 1953 NBA draft and played in 28 games for the Knicks in the 1953–54 season. Ackerman was traded to the Boston Celtics at the end of the 1953–54 season but elected to end his playing career instead of moving his family to Boston. He started a landscaping business that he ran for more than 40 years.

NBA career statistics

Regular season

|-
| style="text-align:left;"| 
| style="text-align:left;"| New York
| 28 || – || 7.9 || .222 || – || .536 || .5 || .8 || – || – || 1.5
|- class="sortbottom"
| style="text-align:left;"| Career
| style="text-align:left;"|
| 28 || – || 7.9 || .222 || – || .536 || .5 || .8 || – || – || 1.5

References

External links 

1930 births
2011 deaths
Basketball players from New York City
American Basketball League (1925–1955) players
American men's basketball players
LIU Brooklyn Blackbirds men's basketball players
New York Knicks draft picks
New York Knicks players
Point guards